The Indianapolis Blues were a baseball team in the National League for one season (1878), in which they finished fifth in the six-team league with a 24–36 record. They were managed by outfielder/first baseman/catcher John Clapp, and played their home games at South Street Park. They had been brought into the League from the League Alliance following their 1877 season.

Their top-hitting regular was right fielder Orator Shafer, who batted .338 with a slugging percentage of .455.  Their most successful pitcher was The Only Nolan (13–22, 2.57), but had two other starters with better ERAs: Jim McCormick (5–8, 1.69) and Tom Healey (6–4, 2.22).

Roster
John Clapp
Art Croft
Silver Flint
Jimmy Hallinan
Tom Healey
Jim McCormick
Russ McKelvy
Candy Nelson
The Only Nolan
Joe Quest
Orator Shafer
Fred Warner
Ned Williamson

See also
1878 Indianapolis Blues season
Indianapolis Blues all-time roster

External links
Baseball Reference Team Index

Defunct Major League Baseball teams
Blues
Professional baseball teams in Indiana
Defunct baseball teams in Indiana
League Alliance teams
Baseball teams disestablished in 1878
Baseball teams established in 1878